First Song is an album by the American jazz bassist Charlie Haden recorded in 1990 and released on the Italian Soul Note label in 1992. The album features Haden playing with pianist Enrico Pieranunzi and drummer Billy Higgins, playing a mix of jazz standards and originals by Haden and Pieranunzi. The three musicians had previously recorded together in 1987, along with trumpeter Chet Baker, on Haden's album Silence.

Reception 
The Allmusic review awarded the album 3 stars.

Track listing 
All compositions by Charlie Haden except where noted.
 "First Song" - 10:06 
 "Je Ne Sais Quoi" (Enrico Pieranunzi) - 5:42 
 "Polka Dots and Moonbeams" (Johnny Burke, Jimmy Van Heusen) - 6:46 
 "Lennie's Pennies" (Lennie Tristano) - 7:03 
 "News Break" (Pieranunzi) - 5:06 
 "All the Way" (Sammy Cahn, Van Heusen) - 6:30 
 "Si Si" (Charlie Parker) - 10:34 
 "For Turiya" - 3:30 
 "In the Moment" - 4:54 
Recorded at Barigozzi Studio in Milano, Italy on April 26, 1990

Personnel
Charlie Haden – bass
Enrico Pieranunzi - piano
Billy Higgins - drums

References 

Black Saint/Soul Note albums
Charlie Haden albums
1992 albums